Soltilo Angkor is a football (soccer) club in Siem Reap, Cambodia. It plays in the Cambodian League 2, the second division of Cambodian football.

Current squad 

(Captain)

Former managers 

  Darren "Charlie" Pomroy

References

External links 

Football clubs in Cambodia
Siem Reap